Gossip Girl: Acapulco is a Mexican television series which premiered on August 5, 2013 in Mexico on Golden Premier and ended on September 6, 2013 after 25 episodes. Gossip Girl: Acapulco is the Mexican adaptation of Gossip Girl, and is produced by El Mall and Warner Brothers International Television. Pedro Torres serves as executive producer. The first season summarises original Gossip Girl seasons 1 and 2, as the producer wanted to have a more dramatic and intense storyline.

On January 14, 2014 it was announced that the series won't be renewed for a second season.

Series overview

Episodes

References

Episodes
 
Lists of Mexican drama television series episodes